The 1989 Midwestern Collegiate Conference men's basketball tournament (now known as the Horizon League men's basketball tournament) was held March 9–11 at UD Arena in Dayton, Ohio.

Xavier defeated Evansville in the championship game, 85–78, to win their fourth consecutive (fifth overall) MCC/Horizon League men's basketball tournament.

The Musketeers received an automatic bid to the 1989 NCAA tournament as the #14 seed in the Southeast region. Evansville received an at-large bid as the #11 seed in the West region. Xavier lost to the eventual national champion, Michigan, in the first round. Evansville defeated Oregon State, before losing to eventual national runner-up Seton Hall in the second round.

Format
All seven conference members participated in the tournament and were seeded based on regular season conference records, with the top seed (Evansville) earning a bye into the semifinal round.

Bracket

References

Horizon League men's basketball tournament
Tournament
Midwestern City Conference men's basketball tournament
Midwestern City Conference men's basketball tournament